The Men's Marathon at the 1987 World Championships in Rome, Italy was held on Sunday September 6, 1987.

Medalists

Abbreviations
All times shown are in hours:minutes:seconds

Records

Final ranking

See also
 1987 Marathon Year Ranking
 Men's Olympic Marathon (1988)

References
 Results
 Results at World Athletics
 IAAF

M
Marathons at the World Athletics Championships
1987 marathons
Men's marathons
Marathons in Italy